Bangs & Crashes is a remix album by English pop band Go West. It was released in 1986 by Chrysalis Records. The album mostly contains remixes of songs from their debut studio album, Go West (1985).  'One Way Street' was featured on the soundtrack to Rocky IV.

Track listing

Chart performance

References

1986 remix albums
Go West (band) albums
Chrysalis Records albums